Mary Jo Wills (born 1951) was the U.S. ambassador to Mauritius and Seychelles starting in February 2010.  She ended her term on February 26, 2011. At the time of her appointment, Wills was the Acting Deputy Assistant Secretary for African Affairs since January 2009.

Wills earned an earned a bachelor's degree in History from Chatham College in Pittsburgh, Pennsylvania, in 1973 and M.B.A. in 1994 from Virginia Tech and has been pursuing a doctorate at their Center for Public Administration and Policy. She has a master's degree in National Security Strategy from the National War College.

References

1951 births
Virginia Tech alumni
American women ambassadors
Ambassadors of the United States to Mauritius
Ambassadors of the United States to Seychelles
Chatham University alumni
National War College alumni
Living people
21st-century American diplomats
21st-century American women